Erik Honoré (born 11 December 1966) is a Norwegian writer, musician, record producer and sound engineer. As a musician, he has collaborated with Jan Bang, David Sylvian, Brian Eno/Peter Schwalm, Jon Hassell, Nils Petter Molvær, Arve Henriksen, Sidsel Endresen, Unni Wilhelmsen, Eivind Aarset, Claudia Scott, Anne Grete Preus, Savoy and produced all the albums from Velvet Belly.

Career 
Honoré was born in Kristiansand. He is a graduate sound engineer and producer at the Norwegian Institute for Stage and Studio, a College in Oslo. He is a published novelist and has a long career as a musician, sound engineer and producer. Together with musician colleague Jan Bang he initiated the Punkt-festivalen in 2005, guest curated by Brian Eno in 2012.

Honoré released the album Year of the Bullet (2012), a joint effort with vocalist and spouse Greta Aagre, and in 2014 released his first solo album Heliographs.

Discography (in selection)

Solo albums 
2014: Heliographs (Hubro)
2017: Unrest (Hubro)

Collaborations 
With Jan Bang
2000: Birth Wish (Pan M Records), with contributions from Arve Henriksen and Christian Wallumrød
2001: Going Nine Ways From Wednesday (Pan M Records), including with Nils Christian Moe-Repstad and Anne Marie Almedal
2010: ... And Poppies From Kandahar (SamadhiSound)
2012: Uncommon Deities (Samadhisound), including with David Sylvian
2013: Narrative From The Subtropics (Jazzland), including with Sidsel Endresen, Arve Henriksen and Eivind Aarset
2013: Victoria (Jazzland), including with Gaute Storaas and Arve Henriksen

With Eivind Aarset
2004: Connected (Jazzland)

With Elsewhere
2005: Hijacker's Songs (Kampen Records)

With Arve Henriksen
2008: Cartography (ECM)
2013: Places of Worship (Rune Grammofon)

With David Sylvian
2011: Died in the Wool – Manafon Variations

With Greta Aagre
2012: Yyear Of The Bullet (Jazzland)
2017: Tuesday Gods (Jazzland)

References

Bibliography
 Orakelveggen (2002) novel
 Ubåten på Nørholm (2003) novel
 Kaprersanger (2005) novel

External links
Erik Honoré in NRK Forfatter
Erik Honoré in Aftenposten Alex
Greta Aagre Erik Honoré year of the bullet Website

21st-century Norwegian novelists
Norwegian pop musicians
Norwegian record producers
Hubro Music artists
1966 births
Living people
Musicians from Kristiansand
Jazzland Recordings (1997) artists